Şahaplı can refer to:

 Şahaplı, Baskil
 Şahaplı, Elâzığ